Florian Mayer was the defending champion, but chose not to defend his title.
Unseeded Vincent Millot defeated No. 3 seed Gilles Müller in the final, 7–6(8–6), 2–6, 6–4.

Seeds

Draw

Finals

Top half

Bottom half

References
 Main Draw
 Qualifying Draw

Internationaux de Nouvelle-Caledonie - Singles
2011 - Singles